In German folklore, a wolpertinger (also called wolperdinger or woiperdinger) is an animal said to inhabit the alpine forests of Bavaria and Baden-Württemberg in southern Germany.

Description
It has a body comprising various animal parts – generally wings, antlers, a tail, and fangs; all attached to the body of a small mammal. The most widespread description portrays the Wolpertinger as having the head of a rabbit, the body of a squirrel, the antlers of a deer, and the wings and occasionally the legs of a pheasant.

Stuffed "wolpertingers", composed of parts of actual stuffed animals, are often displayed in inns or sold to tourists as souvenirs in the animal's "native regions". The Deutsches Jagd- und Fischereimuseum in Munich, Germany features a permanent exhibit on the creature.

It resembles other creatures from German folklore, such as the Rasselbock of the Thuringian Forest, the Dilldapp of the Alemannic region, and the Elwedritsche of the Palatinate region, which accounts describe as a chicken-like creature with antlers; additionally the American Jackalope as well as the Swedish Skvader somewhat resemble the wolpertinger. The Austrian counterpart of the wolpertinger is the raurakl.

According to folklore, Wolpertingers can be found in the forests of Bavaria. Variant regional spellings of the name include Wolperdinger, Woipertingers, and Volpertinger. They are part of a larger family of horned mammals that exist throughout the Germanic regions of Europe, such as the Austrian Raurackl, which is nearly identical to the German Wolpertinger.

In popular culture
 Rumo, a 'Wolperting' is the main character of the novel Rumo and His Miraculous Adventures by Walter Moers, depicted as an anthropomorphic dog with horns.

See also
 Al-mi'raj
 Elwetritsch
 Jackalope
 Lepus cornutus
 Rasselbock
 Skvader
 Shope papilloma virus, a possible inspiration of the fangs and antlers.

References

Further reading

External links 
 

Culture of Bavaria
German legendary creatures
Legendary mammals
Mythological rabbits and hares
Mythological hybrids
Taxidermy hoaxes
Fictional hybrid life forms